Rakshanda Khan Tyagi  (born 27 September 1974) is an Indian model, television actress and anchor recognized for her portrayal of Mallika Seth in Jassi Jaissi Koi Nahin, Tanya Malhotra in Kyunki Saas Bhi Kabhi Bahu Thi, Roshni Chopra in Kasamh Se and Naagin Sumitra in Naagin 3.

Personal life
Khan is married to actor Sachin Tyagi, a father of two daughters from his first marriage. The couple met on the sets of a dance reality show Kabhi Kabhii Pyaar Kabhi Kabhii Yaar in 2008 and got married on 15 March 2014 in Mumbai. Together the couple have a daughter who was born in December 2014.

Dubbing roles

Live action films

Animated films

Television

Other television shows
 Meethi Choori No 1 - Contestant
 Kabhi Kabhii Pyaar Kabhi Kabhii Yaar - Host
 Jodi Kamaal Ki - Host
 Indian Idol 2 Taka tak - Host
 The Music Show: The Real Countdown, Indipop countdown show directed by Ken Ghosh, on EL TV - Host

Web series

References

External links

 

1974 births
Living people
Actresses from Mumbai
Indian television actresses
Indian soap opera actresses
Indian web series actresses
Actresses in Hindi television
Indian women television presenters
Indian voice actresses
Female models from Mumbai
21st-century Indian actresses